Senator Leland may refer to:

Burton Leland (1948–2018), Michigan State Senate
Phineas W. Leland (1798–1870), Massachusetts State Senate
Sherman Leland (1783–1853), Massachusetts State Senate